"Fever" is a song recorded by South Korean girl group GFriend for their seventh extended play Fever Season. The song was released as the title track of the EP on July 1, 2019 by Source Music.

Composition 
The song was written and produced by C-no, Ung Kim and Iggy who was also part of the creation of all the group's singles until "Summer Rain". It was described by Billboard's Tamar Herman, as a "sleek dance track all about the heat of a romance that doesn't diminish even during the cool nighttime".

Chart performance 
The song debuted and peaked at number 27 on the Gaon Digital Chart for the week ending June 30, 2019. The song also placed at number 5 on the componing Download Chart and number 32 a week after the release of the song on the componing Streaming Chart.

Music video 
A music video for the song was uploaded on GFriend's and 1theK's YouTube channels on July 1, 2019, at the same moment as the EP. Then, on July 11, a choreography version of the music video was released, As of 2021 the video gained 31 million views.

Accolades

Charts

See also 
 List of M Countdown Chart winners (2019)

References 

2019 songs
2019 singles
GFriend songs
Korean-language songs
Kakao M singles
Hybe Corporation singles